The Men's 800m race for class T46 amputee athletes at the 2004 Summer Paralympics were held in the Athens Olympic Stadium on 24 & 25 September. The event consisted of 2 heats and a final, and was won by Danny Crates, representing .

1st round

Heat 1
24 Sept. 2004, 09:00

Heat 2
24 Sept. 2004, 09:08

Final round

25 Sept. 2004, 20:45

References

M